Henschel most commonly refers to Henschel & Son, a former German manufacturer.

Henschel may also refer to:

People 
 Henschel (surname)

See also 
 Henschel Quartet, a German String Quartet comprising the three Henschel siblings and cellist Mathias Beyer-Karlshøj, who joined them in 1994
 Thyssen-Henschel, successor to Henschel & Son; industrial and defense contractor; since 1999 part of Rheinmetall Landsysteme GmbH
 Drayman Henschel, an 1898 play by the German playwright Gerhart Hauptmann